Le Val-de-Guéblange (Lorraine Franconian Gewlingedal) is a commune in the Moselle department in Grand Est in north-eastern France.

Localities of the commune: Audviller, Schweix, Steinbach, Wentzviller.

Geography 
 Audviller
 Schweix
 Steinbach
 Wentzviller

History

Administration and Policy

Population

Sites and Monuments 
 Passage of a Roman road.
 Formerly a castle dominated the valley ( the present church of the valley was built on the location). The squires to fill the moats, had the bad idea to divert Alba. So many frogs settled around the castle and prevented them from sleeping . To not be disturbed in their sleep by these frogs, people did the extermination of the castle... The villagers had to get up at night and suddenly shovels, killed all the frogs . Since frogs found in the emblem of the valley of Guéblange .

Clubs 
 Dance club of the foyer Jolival
 Country Top Dance, Country dance club

See also 
 Communes of the Moselle department

References

External links 
 

Valdegueblange